Spalding Memorial Library-Tioga Point Museum is a historic library and museum building located at Athens, Bradford County, Pennsylvania. It was built in 1897–1898, and is a Colonial Revival / Classical Revival-style civic building. The main section measures , and is two-story, brick structure with Indiana limestone trim on a raised basement.  It features a central entry pedimented portico reached by a set of stairs and supported by four Ionic order columns.  A two-story, rear addition was built in 1928, and measures .  An elevator tower was added to it in 1999.

It was added to the National Register of Historic Places in 2000.  It is located in the Athens Historic District.

References

External links
Spalding Memorial Library website
Tioga Point Museum website

Library buildings completed in 1898
Museums in Bradford County, Pennsylvania
Libraries on the National Register of Historic Places in Pennsylvania
Colonial Revival architecture in Pennsylvania
Neoclassical architecture in Pennsylvania
Buildings and structures in Bradford County, Pennsylvania
History museums in Pennsylvania
Native American museums in Pennsylvania
National Register of Historic Places in Bradford County, Pennsylvania
Individually listed contributing properties to historic districts on the National Register in Pennsylvania